The Willem de Kooning Academy is a Dutch academy of media, art, design, leisure and education based in Rotterdam. It was named after one of its most famous alumni, Dutch fine artist Willem de Kooning.

Overview 
The Willem de Kooning Academy is the art school of Rotterdam and part of the Rotterdam University of Applied Sciences (RUAS). It is regarded as one of the most prestigious art schools in the country and no. 1 in advertising and copywriting.
Previously called the Academie van Beeldende Kunsten (Academy of Visual Arts), it has since 1998 carried the name of alumnus Willem de Kooning (1904–1997). Willem de Kooning was born in north Rotterdam and graduated in decoration art (now styling). He went to New York at the age of 22 and became a frontman of the Abstract Expressionism painting movement of the 1940s and 1950s.

The academy's postgraduate programmes are housed in the Piet Zwart Institute, named after faculty alumnus Piet Zwart (1885–1977). Zwart designed stamps, print advertising, books, interiors, furniture (including the Bruynzeel kitchen) in the 1920s and also spent time photographing and painting. He has been officially awarded the title Dutch Designer of the 20th Century.

The academy is proud of de Kooning and Zwart, two artists far ahead of their time, who inspire both students and faculty.

History 
The roots of the art academy in Rotterdam go back to 1773, when a group of Rotterdam artists around the marine painter Hendrik Kobell founded the drawing society Tekengenootschap Hierdoor tot Hooger. In those days drawing societies and academies were founded in many Dutch cities. According to Knolle (2014), these were "instances where new ideas about the production and function of art were developed, exchanged and put into practice. New arrived painters practiced themselves in the evening in drawing from the nude; young apprentice artists and craftsmen received drawing education; other enthusiasts developed their sense for art, for a better life, but also to judiciously collect—preferably Dutch—art."

In 1781, the drawing society was turned into a public academy: the Rotterdamse Academie. In addition to earlier programmes, there were now classes in engineering, perspective theory, anatomy and art philosophy. The academy also kept acting as a meeting place for discussion with 303 members in 1808, while at the education counted 45 pupils. In 1822 the academy was renamed Stadstekenschool voor de Bouwkunde, and in 1832 renamed to Volksindustrieschool.

In 1851 the Academie van Beeldende Kunsten en Technische Wetenschappen was founded from the merger of the Rotterdamse Tekengenootschap and the Rotterdamse Industrieschool. It was located in a building at the Coolvest, now Coolsingel, and headed by Jan Hendrik van de Laar (1807–1874). The school had two divisions, namely division A, where the arts classes were taught, and division B, which was technically oriented.

In 1970 the school was renamed Academie van Beeldende Kunsten, and finally Willem de Kooning Academie in 1998.

Programmes
The Willem de Kooning Academy offers 13 full-time majors and 1 part-time major programme, leading to a bachelor's degree. The programmes are: Fine Art, Photography, Advertising, Animation, Audiovisual Design,  Graphic Design, Illustration, Lifestyle Transformation Design, Fashion Design, Product Design, Spatial Design and Fine Art & Design Teacher Training (full-time and part-time).

The academy also offers a Double Degree programme titled RASL in conjunction with the Eramus University Rotterdam (EUR).

On top of a major, students are able to choose from a wide variety elective minors. It will introduce them to the three graduation profiles: Autonomous Practices, Social Practices and Commercial Practices.

As of present there is also an honours programme for students seeking further development within theory and practice.

The Piet Zwart Institute consist of 4 full-time postgraduate programmes leading to master's degree: Design, Fine Art, Interior Architecture: Research + Design, Media Design (Experimental Publishing & Lens-Based) and Education in Arts. The institute is highly selective with each of the programmes, only admitting 10 to 12 students annually.

Location

The Willem de Kooning Academy is located at Blaak 10 and Wijnhaven 61, two adherent buildings connected with an airbridge. Blaak 10 has always been regarded as the "home base" of the academy. Due to expansion and increase of students enrolling, the adherent Rotterdam University of Applied Sciences' building behind Wijnhaven 61) became entirely occupied by the academy in September 2007. In addition, the already existing programme Leisure Management moved to the academy campus.

In the last couple of years, the academy had had a complete make-over in line with its renewed curriculum. Education is now based around state-of-the-art stations. Stations are not the "property" of any particular major, minor or practice, but are a meeting place for students and teachers across subjects and years. Here you can find all the expertise and facilities (hard- and software) that you need to carry out your work. Students have access to the following stations: Interaction Station, Image & Sound Station, Publication Station, Material Station, Drawing Station, Business Station and Research Station.

Young talent
(Former) students participate in a wide variety of national and international contests, initiatives and programmes. Here is an incomplete overview: SpinAwards Young Talent Show, North Sea Jazz Art Poster Competition, Creative Press Challenge, Dutch Design Awards, Maaskantprijs, Onderzoeksprijs, Steenbergen Stipendium, Drempelprijzen, HEMA ontwerpwedstrijd, BAD Award, Henri Winkelman Award, Woolmark Prize, One Show, VEED Awards, YoungGuns International Award, Volkskrantprijs, Kunstprijs Binnenmaas, Art Rotterdam, Stimuleringsprijs DBKV and Best in Show Award.

Notable alumni

Per Abramsen (1941–2018)
Woody van Amen (1936)
Boris van Berkum (1968)
Henk de Bouter (1968)
Machiel Brandenburg (1907–1984)
Hendrik Chabot (1894–1949)
Wim Chabot (1907–1977)
Simone Dettmeijer (1944–2014)
Dora Dolz (1971)
Kees van Dongen (1877–1968)
Frans van Eijk (1938–2014)
Ron van der Ende (1965)
Mathieu Ficheroux (1926-2003)
Wout van Heusden (1896–1982)
Willem Hussem (1900–1974)
Teun Jacob (1927-2009) 
Willem de Kooning (1904–1997)
Philip Kouwen (1922–2002)
Cor Kraat (1946)
Herman Mees (1880–1964) 
Joep van Lieshout (1963)

Ton van Os (1941)
Don Satijn (1953)
Han Schuil (1958)
Flor Silvester (1923–2008)
Frans van Straaten (1963)
Piet van Stuivenberg (1901–1988)
Kees Torn (1967)
Bik Van Der Pol (1959/1961)
Petrus van der Velden (1837–1913)
Willem van Veldhuizen (1954)
August Willem van Voorden (1881–1921)
Anton Vrede (1953)
Fiep Westendorp (1916–2004)
Piet Zwart (1885–1977)

References

External links 

Willem de Kooning Academy
Piet Zwart Institute
History of The Academy (in Dutch)
SJP Young Talent Awards(in Dutch)
Prestigious Artschool(in Dutch)

 
Willem de Kooning
Art schools in the Netherlands
Buildings and structures in Rotterdam
Articles containing video clips
1773 establishments in the Dutch Republic